Tlhareseleele is a small village in the Southern District of Botswana.

Population 
According to the 2011 population census Tlhareseleele has a total population of 711 residents with a total of 341 males and 370 females.

See also 
 Southern District (Botswana)

References 

Villages in Botswana
Southern District (Botswana)